Antoine Tamestit (born 1979) is a French violist.

Tamestit studied at the Conservatoire de Paris, and further with Jesse Levine at Yale University, and with Tabea Zimmermann. He won the 2001 Primrose International Viola Competition, the 2003 Young Concert Artists International Auditions and the 2004 ARD International Music Competition. He was a BBC Radio 3 New Generation Artist from 2004 to 2006.

He has performed at such venues as the Royal Concertgebouw, the Vienna Musikverein, and Carnegie Hall and with the Santa Cecilia Orchestra in Rome [14 March 2019]. In 2014, he played viola for the recording of Berlioz's Harold en Italie, conducted by Valery Gergiev.

References

External links
 
 Antoine Tamestit on Intermusica

1979 births
Living people
Place of birth missing (living people)
Conservatoire de Paris alumni
Academic staff of the Hochschule für Musik und Tanz Köln
Maurice Vieux International Viola Competition prize-winners
BBC Radio 3 New Generation Artists
French classical violists
21st-century French musicians
French male musicians
21st-century French male musicians
21st-century violists